Lepidargyrus ancorifer is a species of plant bug in the family Miridae. It is found in Africa, Europe and Northern Asia (excluding China), and North America.

References

Further reading

 
 

Phylini
Articles created by Qbugbot
Insects described in 1858